The Deadlys Awards were an annual celebration of Australian Aboriginal and Torres Strait Islander achievement in music, sport, entertainment and community.

Music
Outstanding Contribution to Aboriginal Music: Gus Williams
Outstanding Contribution to Aboriginal Music: Vic Simms
Band of the Year: Letterstick Band
Most Promising New Talent: J Boy
Country Artist of the Year: Troy Cassar-Daley
Male Artist of the Year: Kutcha Edwards
Female Artist of the Year: Kerrianne Cox
Album Release of the Year: Warren H Williams Where My Heart Is
Single Release: Stiff Gins Morning Star
Excellence in Film or Theatrical Score: Mark Ovenden & Yothu Yindi for Yolngu Boy

Community
Aboriginal Broadcaster of The Year: 2CUZ FM

References

The Deadly Awards
2001 music awards
2001 in Australian music
Indigenous Australia-related lists